Kazemır Qudiyev (born 29 April 1972) is an Azerbaijani professional football coach and a former player. He also holds Russian citizenship.

Club career
He made his professional debut in the Soviet Second League B in 1990 for FC Avtodor Vladikavkaz.

Personal life
He is the father of Vitali Gudiyev.

References

1972 births
Living people
Soviet footballers
Azerbaijani footballers
Azerbaijan international footballers
Azerbaijani expatriate footballers
Russian Premier League players
FC Zhemchuzhina Sochi players
FC Kuban Krasnodar players
FC Akhmat Grozny players
Azerbaijani football managers
Azerbaijani expatriate football managers
Soviet Azerbaijani people
Association football goalkeepers
FC Spartak Vladikavkaz players
FC Sheksna Cherepovets players
Expatriate football managers in Russia